USS Hopkins has been the name of more than one United States Navy ship, named in honor of Commodore Esek Hopkins, and may refer to:

, a destroyer in commission from 1903 to 1919
, a patrol vessel in commission from 1918 to 1920
, a destroyer commissioned in 1921, converted into a fast minesweeper in 1939, and decommissioned in 1945

United States Navy ship names